Blue Hill Bay is a bay lying to the west of Mount Desert Island in Hancock County, Maine, United States. Morgan Bay, Union River Bay, and Western Bay empty into it. Long Island in the north of the bay is the largest uninhabited island in Maine.

Due to its protected waters, Blue Hill Bay is popular with recreational boaters. In addition to crab, lobster, and other fisheries, aquaculture of salmon and mussels is practiced in the bay. The shores of the bay are an important breeding ground for harbor seals.

References

Bays of Hancock County, Maine
Mount Desert Island
Bays of Maine